The Zolotitsa is a river in Primorsky District of Arkhangelsk Oblast in Russia. It flows into the White Sea at the Winter Coast.

References 

Rivers of Arkhangelsk Oblast
Drainage basins of the White Sea